Leigh Rubin is the creator of the syndicated comic strip Rubes.  Born in the Queens borough of New York City, Rubin was brought to California at age 3.  Rubin's parents sold advertising and by the early 70s, he was working in the family print shop.

In 1978 he started his own greeting card company, Rubes Publications, featuring early renditions of his animal characters.  He designed a greeting card series with characters who took the shape of musical notes and later published his first cartoon collection, Notable Quotes, in 1981.

In 1984, Steven Hendrickson,( https://www.facebook.com/steven.hendrickson1?fref=ts)entertainment editor for the Antelope Valley Press, Palmdale, California, approached Rubin about writing a daily comic for the paper.  After illustrating about 100 cartoons, he began pitching major and minor syndicates. Rubes has been distributed by Creators Syndicate since 1989 and now appears in more than 400 newspapers worldwide.

Leigh also enjoys a busy schedule giving thought-provoking and entertaining cartoon presentations at conferences, as well as professional organizations all around the country. 
In September 2018 Leigh Rubin had the honor of being selected as Rochester Institute of Technology's first Cartoonist-in Residence.
Leigh's first visit as the Cartoonist-in Residence was in November 2018 where he lectured and taught classes on creativity, imagination as well as addressing the business aspects of cartooning, branding and syndication.
Rochester Institute of Technology and the Rochester Democrat and Chronicle also hosted the East Coast premiere of Drawing Inspiration, a docu-reality series which celebrates creativity, inspiration and innovation he co-created with filmmaker and special effects fabricator Ryan Johnson to a packed house on the RIT campus.

In April, 2019 Leigh spent another week on the RIT campus and in addition to teaching classes he took part in a public discussion with RIT Senior Lecturer Mike Johansson on Curiosity & Creativity.
The week was capped off by the unveiling of Leigh's BrickCityLand mural during the opening of RIT's Imagine RIT: Creativity and Innovation Festival, a campus-wide, open to-the public event that showcases the creative and innovative spirit of RIT students, faculty and staff.

Rubin will be returning to Rochester Institute of Technology in October 2019 for the Brick City Homecoming and Family Weekend, and annual tradition to celebrate alumni, students, parents and families, faculty, staff and friends of the University.

On August 25, 2020 Leigh Rubin and Phil Hands, editorial cartoonist for the Wisconsin State Journal  performed a live stream event "When Cartoon Worlds Collide: A Twistedly Absurd Mashup of Politics and Comics" hosted by 
Deadline Club, the  New York City chapter of Society of Professional Journalists

Publications

Books
 Notable Quotes. Rubes Publications, 1981. 
 Encore! Rubes Publications, 1983. 
 Amusing Arrangements. Rubes Publications, 1985. 
 The Penguin is Mightier than the Swordfish. Fragments West / Valentine Press, 1987. 
 Rubes. Penguin Group, 1988. 
 Sharks Are People Too! Rubes Publications, 1990. 
 Calves Can Be So Cruel: The Best of Rubes Cartoons. Penguin Group, 1990. 
 Rubes Calves Can Be So Cruel. Ravette Publishing, 1992. 
 Rubes Bible Cartoons. Hendrickson Publishers, 1999. 
 Rubes Then & Now: Cartoons for the Millennium and Beyond! Image Maker Publishing, 1999. 
 The Wild Life of Dogs: A Rubes Cartoon Book. BowTie Press, 2003. 
 The Wild Life of Pets: A Rubes Cartoon Book. BowTie Press, 2003. 
 The Wild Life of Cows: A Rubes Cartoon Book. BowTie Press, 2003. 
 The Wild Life of Farm Animals: A Rubes Cartoon Book. BowTie Press, 2003. 
 The Wild Life of Cats: A Rubes Cartoon Book. Willow Creek Press, 2005. 
 The Wild Life of Love: A Rubes Cartoon Collection. Willow Creek Press, 2006. 
 The Wild and Twisted World of Rubes: A Rubes Cartoon Collection. Andrews McMeel Publishing, 2010. 
 Rubes: Twisted Pop Culture. Pediment Group/Democrat and Chronicle, 2016.
 The Big Book of Moo. Pediment Group/NDHIA, 2016.

Calendars
 Rubes Farm Animal Funnies Family Organizer 2006 (Wall) Calendar. Willow Creek Press, 2005. 
 Rubes Zoo in a Box 2006 Daily Box Calendar. Willow Creek Press, 2005. 
 Rubes Animal Antics Family Organizer 2007 (Wall) Calendar. Willow Creek Press, 2006. 
 Rubes Zoo in a Box 2007 Daily Box Calendar. Willow Creek Press, 2006. 
 Rubes Animal Antics Family Organizer 2008 (Wall) Calendar. Willow Creek Press, 2007. 
 Rubes Zoo in a Box 2008 Daily Box Calendar. Willow Creek Press, 2007. 
 Rubes Zoo in a Box 2009 Daily Box Calendar. Willow Creek Press, 2008. 
 Rubes Zoo in a Box 2010 Daily Box Calendar. Willow Creek Press, 2009. 
 Rubes Zoo in a Box 2011 Daily Box Calendar. Willow Creek Press, 2010. 
 Rubes 2012 (Wall) Calendar. Day Dream Publishing, 2011. 
 Rubes Zoo in a Box 2012 Daily Box Calendar. Mead, 2011. 
 Rubes Zoo in a Box 2013 Daily Box Calendar. Mead, 2012. 
 Rubes Zoo in a Box 2012 Daily Box Calendar. Willow Creek Press,  
 Rubes Zoo in a Box 2014 Daily Box Calendar. Willow Creek Press.     
 Rubes Zoo in a Box 2015 Daily Box Calendar.  Willow Creek Press,
 Rubes Zoo in a Box 2016 Daily Box Calendar.  Willow Creek Press, 
 Rubes Zoo in a Box 2017 Daily Box Calendar.  Willow Creek Press, 
 Rubes Zoo in a Box 2018 Daily Box Calendar.  Willow Creek Press, 
 Rubes Zoo in a Box 2019 Daily Box Calendar.  Willow Creek Press, 
 Rubes Zoo in a Box 2020 Daily Box Calendar.  Willow Creek Press,

Mega Mini Kit
 Rubes Cow Tipping: You Can't Keep a Good Cow Down! Running Press, 2011.

References

External links
Rubes Cartoons website

American comic strip cartoonists
Year of birth missing (living people)
Living people
People from Queens, New York